The Echo Cliffs are a prominent geological feature in northern Arizona. They are found in Coconino County in the Navajo Nation about 20 miles (32 km) east of Grand Canyon National Park.

The Tutuveni petroglyphs are found at a site at the base of the cliffs.

Geology
The cliffs form the western escarpment of a mesa called the Kaibito Plateau and follow the axis of the Echo Monocline. Rocks of the Wingate sandstone, Navajo Sandstone, Kayenta Formation, all part of the Glen Canyon Group, crop out along the cliffs' length. The Chinle Formation underlies the Glen Canyon Group in the Echo Cliffs area.

Comparatively little talus is found at the base of the cliffs. Its rocks tend to break up forming sediments which are quickly removed by wind and stream action.

See also 
 Navajo Bridge
 Paria Canyon
 Vermilion Cliffs

References 

Cliffs of Arizona
Chinle Formation
Geography of the Navajo Nation
Landforms of Coconino County, Arizona
Colorado Plateau

External links

 Echo Cliffs, and the Marble Plateau, at Geogypsytraveler.com